Nanda is an Indian surname. It is found among the Punjabi Khatris. The Nanda Khatris have produced a lineage of governors in Eminabad. They have also given various prime ministers in Jammu-Kashmir state. Jawala Sahai, a notable revenue officer of Maharaja Ranjit Singh and an official of Raja Gulab Singh at the Lahore Darbar belonged to a Nanda Khatri family. Many Nanda Khatris were also settled in Ludhiana prior to the partition of India. A Nanda Khatri called Suthre Shah from Baramulla, Kashmir founded the sect of Suthra. He was a disciple of Guru Hargobind.

Notable people 
 Ananya Nanda, Indian playback singer and winner of Indian idol junior
 Ashish Nanda, Director of IIM Ahmedabad
 Biddanda Chengappa Nanda, (1931–2018), Indian Army General
 Chetanya Nanda, Indian cricketer 
 Gaurav Nanda, International Method Acting Coach 
 Gulshan Nanda (1929–1985), Indian novelist and screenwriter
 Gulzarilal Nanda (1898–1998), former Indian Prime Minister
 Har Prasad Nanda (1917–1999), Indian automotive industrialist
 Ishwar Chander Nanda, father of Punjabi drama
 Jimmy Nanda, Mrs India 2007
 Kiranmoy Nanda (born 1944), politician
 Meera Nanda (born 1954), Indian writer, historian and philosopher of science
 Nikhil Nanda (born 1974), Indian businessman, Joint Managing Director of Escorts Group
 Prashanta Nanda (born 1947), movie actor from Odisha
 Ratish Nanda, conservation architect
 Ravindra Nanda (born 1943), HOD of Craniofacial Sciences at Division of Orthodontics
 Ritu Nanda (1948–2020), daughter of Raj Kapoor
 Sardarilal Mathradas Nanda (1915–2009), Indian Navy Admiral
 Suresh Nanda, Lieutenant Commander in Indian Army 
 Serena Nanda (born 1938), American author, anthropologist, and professor emeritus
 William Nanda-Bissell, Chairman at FabIndia

References

Indian surnames
Surnames of Indian origin
Punjabi-language surnames
Hindu surnames
Khatri clans
Khatri surnames